The China Spallation Neutron Source is an accelerator-based neutron source, operated by the Institute of High Energy Physics, under construction at Dongguan in Guangdong province - the first major scientific facility in south China.  The project was approved by Chinese central government in 2005.  Construction began 20 October 2011, with commissioning planned for 2016, and operation in 2018.

The source contains a proton synchrotron fed by a linear accelerator; short (<500ns) pulses of  1.6 GeV protons are extracted from the synchrotron 25 times a second; these pulses strike a tungsten-metal target (cooled with heavy water) to produce energetic neutrons, which are reduced to scientifically-interesting energies by a variety of moderators.

The intended budget for the project is 1.5 billion CNY; this limits the initial power of the machine to about 120 kW, but it has been designed so that its power can readily be quadrupled if more funding becomes available, by upgrading the linear accelerator and the RF components of the synchrotron.

See also 
 Biological small-angle scattering
 European Spallation Source
 Inelastic neutron scattering
 J-PARC
 Neutron diffraction
 Neutron spin echo
 Protein dynamics
 Soft matter
 Spallation Neutron Source
 Spin echo

References

Buildings and structures in Dongguan
Research institutes of the Chinese Academy of Sciences
Neutron facilities